Pomini is a surname. Notable people with the surname include:

Alberto Pomini (born 1981), Italian footballer
Edgardo Pomini (born 1917), Argentine fencer and Olympian